Salim Sayegh is a Lebanese academic and politician who served as minister of social affairs from 2009 to 2011.

Early life and education
Sayegh was born into a Maronite family. He graduated from Lebanese American University in 1983. He received a master's degree in international relations and diplomacy in 1989. He also holds a PhD in law from the University of Paris in 1992.

Career
Sayegh worked as professor at the University of South Paris from 1993 to 2009 and also, served as the director of university's conflict resolution center during the same period. He is a member of the Kataeb party and was elected as second vice president in February 2008 when Amine Gemayel became the president of the party.  He has also been a member of the party's political bureau and head of the foreign affairs committee in the party since 2008,

Sayegh was appointed minister of social affairs in the cabinet led by Prime Minister Saad Hariri on 9 November 2009. Sayegh resigned from his party post following his appointment as minister. He was among the members of the committee that was charged with drafting the government program. Sayegh's tenure lasted until June 2011, and he was replaced by Wael Abou Faour as minister.

In addition, he is a member of World Bank board for social politics in the MENA region.

References

External links

Living people
Lebanese American University alumni
University of Paris alumni
Academic staff of Paris-Sud University
Kataeb Party politicians
Government ministers of Lebanon
Lebanese Maronites
Year of birth missing (living people)